USS Manlove (DE-36) was an  of the United States Navy during World War II. She was promptly sent off into the Pacific Ocean to protect convoys and other ships from Japanese submarines and fighter aircraft. She performed dangerous work in numerous battle areas, and was awarded five battle stars.

Namesake
Arthur Cleon Manlove was born on 19 March 1901 in Tipton, Indiana. He enlisted in the Navy on 28 August 1923. On duty aboard  from 3 November 1941, he died with other members of the crew during the Japanese Attack on Pearl Harbor on 7 December 1941.

Construction and commissioning
Manlove was laid down as BDE-36, on 24 February 1943 by the Navy Yard, Mare Island, California; redesignated DE-36, on 16 June 1943; launched on 28 July 1943; sponsored by Mrs. Arthur C. Manlove, widow of the ship's namesake; and commissioned on 8 November 1943.

World War II 
After post-shakedown repairs at San Francisco, California, Manlove escorted a convoy to Pearl Harbor and upon arrival, on 16 January 1944, commenced local training operations. The next month, she made one round trip voyage to Majuro, Marshall Islands, returning on 18 February. She again departed for the Marshalls on the 28th. From 5 March – 16 May, she cruised the Marshall Islands area on anti-submarine patrols and in hunter-killer (HUK) operations.

Enemy submarine located and sunk
On 24 March, during her first HUK assignment, she located the Japanese transport submarine , then attempting to replenish the enemy garrison at Wotje. In the ensuing coordinated depth charge run, Manlove and her companion, sank the Japanese boat.

Convoy protection assignments
Manlove departed Majuro on 16 May for Kwajalein, beginning convoy escort duty between the two atolls. In mid-June, she extended her escort area and screened fleet oilers to a refueling rendezvous at sea off the Marianas. She then sailed to Eniwetok for a month of patrol. In early August, she returned to escort duty and joined a convoy headed for Hawaii. The convoy arrived Pearl Harbor on 29 August. Following repairs, Manlove participated in training operations with submarines in Hawaiian waters until her departure for the Marshalls on 8 October.
 
The escort arrived Eniwetok on 17 October. From then until the following March, she was primarily engaged in screening convoys between Eniwetok and Ulithi, Caroline Islands. She briefly interrupted her cruises between these islands in early February 1945 for an escort convoy assignment to Manus, Admiralty Islands.

Damaged by an exploding Japanese airplane
On 9 March, Manlove departed Eniwetok for Saipan to join units of the 5th Fleet assembling for the Okinawa campaign. She sailed with the invasion fleet on 26 March and arrived on patrol station off Okinawa on 2 April. There she assisted in repelling enemy air attacks until damaged on 11 April by an exploding Japanese airplane. After repairs at Guam, she returned to patrols off Okinawa. With only one break in this duty, escorting a convoy to the Philippines and back, she continued to contribute to the success of the Okinawa campaign until ordered back to the U.S. on 5 July.

Post-war
Proceeding via Eniwetok and Pearl Harbor, Manlove arrived at Seattle, Washington, on 26 June 1945. She was inactivated at Puget Sound Naval Shipyard; decommissioned on 16 November 1945; and was sold for scrap to A. G. Schoonmaker Co., Inc., of New York City, on 4 December 1947.

Awards

References

External links

 

Evarts-class destroyer escorts
Ships built in Vallejo, California
1943 ships
World War II frigates and destroyer escorts of the United States